Varazdeh-e Olya (also Romanized as Varāzdeh-e ‘Olyā; also known as Varāzdeh-ye Bālā) is a village in Mianrud Rural District, Chamestan District, Nur County, Mazandaran Province, Iran. At the 2006 census, its population was 292, in 72 families.

References 

Populated places in Nur County